The Trousdale Turner Correctional Center is a private prison for men, located in Hartsville, Trousdale County, Tennessee, owned and operated by CoreCivic (formerly Corrections Corporation of America) under contract with the Tennessee Department of Correction.

The facility opened in 2016, and is located on the site of the canceled Hartsville Nuclear Plant. It holds a maximum of 2672 male inmates at medium security.
There are seven housing units within the facility, each housing different number of inmates. The following, three-pod, housing units each house a maximum of 360 inmates: D, C, F, B and E. Housing unit W contains four pods, each holding a maximum of 128 inmates, for a total of 512. The inmates in this housing unit live in an open bay setting. Which means they are not in cells but sleep side by side in bunks. The segregation unit, A, contains five pods with a maximum capacity of 360.

History 
Between its opening in January 2016 and May, an inmate was stabbed on February 26 when an officer left a housing unit unattended, the facility's newly-appointed warden resigned by early March without explanation, a TDOC official formally complained that CCA officers had no control over the prisoners, the entire facility unexpectedly halted taking new state inmates because of these "growing pains", and an officer was assaulted.

On September 6, 2017 an officer was assaulted in E Unit by an inmate high on methamphetamine. The inmate used a homemade weapon to stab the officer multiple times. The officer was unable to escape the attack, which resulted in the inmates in his pod to come to his aid.

On June 15, 2019 at approximately 3:00 P.M. CDT an inmate was found deceased in his cell during count. Further investigation revealed the inmate had been in an altercation with another inmate.

On August 30, 2019 an inmate in W unit attacked and sexually assaulted a mental health staff member. The staff member was flown to Vanderbilt Medical Center for treatment, however, the attack resulted in a loss of vision for that staff member. The matter is currently under investigation.

On January 25, 2020 a protective custody inmate was fatally stabbed by another inmate in the segregation unit. 

on December 17, 2020 an inmate was fatally wounded by his cellmate while being house in the segregation unit. 

In 2020, an outbreak of COVID 19 at the Trousdale Turner Correctional Center made Trousdale County the county with the highest per capita infection rate in the United States in early May. As of May 8, 1,284 prisoners at Trousdale had tested positive for the coronavirus, as had 50 employees and contractors at the facility. By August, three infected prisoners had died and a total of 1,379 prisoners had been infected.

With the various issues inside the facility and the recent events of COVID-19, the warden has decided to place the facility under lockdown till further notice.

Legal status 
As of 2016, Tennessee houses state inmates in four private prisons.  The state's Private Prison Contracting Act of 1986, however, authorizes one single private prison for state inmates.  As of 2016 Tennessee technically contracts directly with CoreCivic for inmates held at South Central Correctional Facility.  For Trousdale and the two others, the state circumvents the statute by contracting with the local county.  In turn the county signs an agreement with CoreCivic.

References 

Prisons in Tennessee
Buildings and structures in Trousdale County, Tennessee
CoreCivic
2016 establishments in Tennessee